Neil Fitzhenry (born 24 September 1978) is an English retired footballer.

References

English footballers
Living people
1978 births
Association football defenders
Wigan Athletic F.C. players
Leigh Genesis F.C. players
Southport F.C. players
Expatriate association footballers in the Republic of Ireland
League of Ireland players
English Football League players